El rey pasmado (English: The Dumbfounded King) is a 1991 French-Portuguese-Spanish comedy-historical film directed by Imanol Uribe and written by Joan Potau and Gonzalo Torrente Ballester. The screenplay was based on Torrente's 1989 novel Crónica del rey pasmado.

Plot
Story set in 17th century Spanish court, where King Philip IV, on a getaway with Count of Peña Andrada, is stunned to see the naked body of Marfisa, a prostitute of the town (in a pose reminiscent of the Rokeby Venus). After this discovery, the king decides to see the naked body of his wife, Queen Elisabeth of France.

Due to this the Grand Inquisitor is obliged to convene a meeting of theologians to discuss the matter. Both sides of the debate are represented by the figure of the friar Villaescusa, which ensures that the claim of the king is a serious sin that can bring punishment on the whole country and the Father Almeida, a Jesuit missionary who replies that the luck of the governed depends on the ability of its rulers rather than their morality and that the desire of the king is a private matter. Although the Queen is willing to accommodate to the wishes of the king, Villaescusa and his minions do enough to frustrate his desires. Finally, with the help of the Jesuit and the Count of la Peña Andrada, the King gets to meet with the queen alone in the monastery of San Plácido and achieves his goal.

Meanwhile, the Count-Duke of Olivares fears that he could being punished by God because he fails to have children with his wife, so he gets advice from Villaescusa, who informs him that the pleasure he and his wife obtain when performing the sexual act is to be blamed for the infertility. The "divinely inspired" solution proposed by Villaescusa is that the Earl and his wife copulate in the choir of the church of San Plácido (where by coincidence are also very nearly the kings) in front of the choir nuns. At the end of this sexual encounter the Count-Duke of Olivares receives two letters which informs him of the successful arrival of the Indian fleet to Cadiz and the victory of Spanish troops in Flanders. Villaescusa says that the happy ending is due to the sacrifices they all have passed, but the Count Duke replies that by the date of the letters it could be seen that the fleet had arrived in Cadiz two days ago "just the day King went whores". The Count-Duke sends Villaescusa to Rome with a sealed letter asking to not let him go until he has changed his attitude.

Cast

Production

Most of the film was shot in the 16th century Palace of the Marquess of Santa Cruz in Viso del Marqués and at the Monastery of Uclés.

Reception
Spanish critic Carlos Aguilar in his Guía del cine español says that the film has some flaws, such as the different treatment of historical characters, but these are outweighed by good realization and a good cast. Critics also noted the close resemblance of Gabino Diego and Gurruchaga with Philip IV and the Count-Duke of Olivares respectively.

Awards and nominations

Won
Goya Awards
Best Actor in a Supporting Role (Juan Diego)
Best Costume Design (Javier Artiñano)
Best Makeup and Hairstyles (Romana González and Josefa Morales)
Best Original Score (José Nieto)
Best Production Design (Félix Murcia)
Best Production Supervision (Andrés Santana)
Best Screenplay – Adapted (Joan Potau and Gonzalo Torrente Malvido)
Best Sound (Ricard Casals and Gilles Ortion)

Nominated
Goya Awards
Best Actor in a Leading Role (Gabino Diego)
Best Actor in a Supporting Role (Javier Gurruchaga)
Best Actress in a Supporting Role (María Barranco)
Best Cinematography (Hans Burman)
Best Director (Imanol Uribe)
Best Film

References

External links
 
 

1991 films
1990s Spanish-language films
Films set in the 1620s
Spanish comedy films
Films set in Madrid
French comedy films
Portuguese comedy films
1990s French films
1990s Spanish films